These lists of anime serve to provide an organized and methodological approach for finding related content about anime topics.

2012-2021 
 Pre-1939—A single page containing a descending list of releases from before 1939
 Table of years in anime—A table form for individual years in anime

Genres 
These lists are not all inclusive, each list contains works that are representative of the genre.
List of action anime
List of adventure anime
List of comedy anime
List of cooking anime and manga
List of drama anime
List of fantasy anime
List of harem anime and manga
List of hentai anime
List of horror anime
List of isekai works
List of mecha anime
List of mystery anime
List of romance anime
List of science fiction anime
List of slice of life anime
List of sports anime and manga
List of yaoi anime and manga
List of yuri anime and manga

Lists of companies
List of anime companies
List of Japanese animation studios

Anime aired by company
List of anime aired on Fuji Television
List of anime aired on MBS
List of anime aired on Nippon Television
List of anime aired on TBS
List of anime broadcast by NHK
List of anime broadcast by Tokyo MX
List of anime broadcast by TV Tokyo

Other 
 List of anime based on video games
 List of anime by release date (1939–1945)
 List of anime by release date (1946–1959)
 List of anime by release date (pre-1939)
 List of anime conventions
 List of anime distributed in the United States
 List of anime franchises by episode count
 List of anime releases made concurrently in the United States and Japan
 List of anime series by episode count
 List of anime theatrically released in the United States
 Lists of anime and manga characters 
 List of bisexual characters in anime
 List of gay characters in anime
 List of highest-grossing anime films
 List of lesbian characters in anime
 Lists of animated feature films